Yun Ho-jung (Korean: 윤호중, born 27 March 1963) is a South Korean politician and former activist. He has been the parliamentary leader of the Democratic Party since 16 April 2021. He is currently the interim President of the party since 10 March 2022, which he previously served from 16 April to 2 May 2021. He also served as the Secretary-General of his party from 2018 to 2020. He is also the incumbent Member of the National Assembly for Guri.

Career 
Born in Gapyeong in 1963, Yun attended Chuncheon High School. Then, he studied philosophy at Seoul National University in 1980s. In 1984, he was detained for being involved in SNU fraction incident; other notable figures involved are Rhyu Si-min, Paek Tae-woong and Shim Jae-chul.

He started his political career in 1988 as assistant administrator in the Office of Planning & Coordination of the Peace Democratic Party. Then, he became closer to the party chairman, Kim Dae-jung (aka DJ), who was later elected the President of the Republic. Yun used to work at the Office of the President under President Kim, mainly handling issues related to policy planning. From 1991, he has also been the secretary to the former MP Han Kwang-ok, a notable pro-DJ figure.

Yun initially ran as an MP candidate for Guri in the 2000 election under the banner of the ruling Millennium Democratic Party (MDP) but was not elected. The year after, he was appointed deputy spokesperson of the MDP. He later withdrew from the MDP and joined the Uri Party, along with the other dissidents. In the 2004 election, he was elected to the National Assembly.

Though he was not re-elected in 2008, Yun led his Democratic Party to form an opposition alliance with the Democratic Labour Party, the Creative Korea Party, the New Progressive Party and the National Participation Party at the 2010 local elections. Following his re-election in 2012 under the Democratic Unionist Party (DUP) banner, he worked for an alliance with the DUP candidate Moon Jae-in and an independent candidate Ahn Cheol-soo for the presidential election in December. In 2013, he ran for the DUP's vice presidency but was not elected.

After the election of Moon Jae-in in 2017, Yun was considered a potential candidate for the newly-created Minister of SMEs and Startups but was not appointed. In September 2018, he was appointed the Secretary-General of the Democratic Party of Korea shortly after the election of party president Lee Hae-chan.

On 16 April 2021, Yun was elected the new parliamentary leader of the Democratic Party, defeating Park Wan-joo. He has also become the acting party President, as the position was vacant since the resignation of Lee Nak-yon in March.

Political views 
Formerly holding pro-LGBT views, Yun expressed anti-LGBT views prior to the 2020 South Korean legislative election, stating that his party is not willing to cooperate with pro-LGBT parties, such as Green Party Korea. He is a moderate figure of the pro-Moon Jae-in faction.

Controversy 
On 27 March 2021, during the campaign of Park Young-sun, who was running for Mayor of Seoul in the 2021 by-elections, Yun told people, "There is a candidate who keeps lying, even though he knows he owns a property in Naegok-dong.", referring the PPP candidate and former Mayor Oh Se-hoon. He then asked people, "Is he rubbish or not?", and gave the answer, "Yes, he is rubbish." He also stated: "(Oh) approved a master plan, but he kept denying he had done so. Is he rubbish or not?" He finally urged people to "separate the rubbish properly on 7 April." The PPP subsequently condemned his remarks as "severe hate speech" and "ruinous social splitting that must be stopped immediately."

Election results

General elections

References

External links 
 Yun Ho-jung on Facebook
 Yun Ho-jung on Twitter
 Yun Ho-jung on Blog

1963 births
Living people
People from Gapyeong County
South Korean activists
Minjoo Party of Korea politicians
Papyeong Yun clan